Kuala Kubu Bharu (also spelt Kuala Kubu Baru, Kuala Kubu Bahru or Kuala Kubu Baharu; abbreviated to KKB), is the district capital of Hulu Selangor District, Selangor, Malaysia. It is located 60 km north of Kuala Lumpur.

In 1883, the Sungai Selangor dam broke, causing a massive flood. It swept away the entire town the second time it broke in 1926, except for Guan Yin Gu Si Temple and Al-Hidayah Mosque. Following the flood, the British then relocated the town to a higher elevation and began to rebuild the town. Originally the town was named Kuala Kubu, however after the flood happened, the town was then renamed Kuala Kubu Bharu or New Kuala Kubu in English.

Kuala Kubu Bharu is arguably the first garden township in Asia, planned by the first government town planner of British Federated Malay States (FMS), Charles Crompton Reade in 1925.

The town is filled with pre-war buildings, mostly built by the locals, and they showcase the culture and architectural designs of that period of time.

Politics
Kuala Kubu Bharu (N6) forms its own electoral district of the Selangor State Legislative Assembly. The area is currently represented by Lee Kee Hiong of the DAP

On the national level Kuala Kubu Bharu is part of the Hulu Selangor (P09) parliamentary constituency, currently represented by YB June Leow Hsiad Hui of the federal ruling coalition Pakatan Harapan.

Notable people
 Thomas Gerrard, World War I flying ace, was born in town
 Eja, Actress, host and model

References

Adopted from Tragedi Kuala Kubu 1883 - Buku Rekod Malaysia Edisi Kedua, Ghulam Jie M Khan

Hulu Selangor District
Towns in Selangor
Dam failures in Asia